A Dog on Barkham Street is a children's novel published in 1960 written by Mary Stolz and illustrated by Leonard Shortall. It was voted one of 41 notable children's books of 1960 in a poll of librarians conducted by the American Library Association.

A companion novel, The Bully of Barkham Street, was published in 1963. This presents the events of A Dog on Barkham Street from the bully's point of view.

Plot 
The main character, Edward Frost, is a kid who is constantly bullied by his neighbor, Martin Hastings. Edward asks his parents if they can move to a far away place, to escape his bully, but they deny him. He also asks for a dog, but his parents do not believe he is responsible enough to care for one,because he isn't. One day, Uncle Joe, a wandering hobo, gives the Edward a collie named Argess.

See also

References

American children's novels
1960 American novels
Novels about bullying
Children's novels about animals
Harper & Brothers books
1960 children's books